Andrea Mastrillo (1563–1624) was a Roman Catholic prelate who served as Archbishop of Messina (1618–1624).

Biography
Andrea Mastrillo was born in Palermo, Italy in 1563.
On 16 May 1618, he was appointed during the papacy of Pope Paul V as Archbishop of Messina.
On 20 May 1618, he was consecrated bishop by Giovanni Garzia Mellini, Cardinal-Priest of Santi Quattro Coronati, with Paolo De Curtis, Bishop Emeritus of Isernia, and Giovanni Battista Lancellotti, Bishop of Nola, serving as co-consecrators. 
He served as Archbishop of Messina until his death in 1624. 
While bishop, he was the principal co-consecrator of Fabrizio Antinori, Archbishop of Acerenza e Matera (1622).

References

External links and additional sources
 (for Chronology of Bishops) 
 (for Chronology of Bishops) 

17th-century Roman Catholic bishops in Sicily
Bishops appointed by Pope Paul V
1563 births
1624 deaths